I Know may refer to:

Music

Albums 
I Know (Luther Vandross album) or the title song (see below), 1998
I Know (Tone Damli album) or the title song (see below), 2009
I Know, by John Gorka, 1987
I Know, an EP by Bayonne, 2018

Songs 
"I Know" (Aly & AJ song), 2017
"I Know" (Dionne Farris song), 1995
"I Know" (Drake Bell song), 2006
"I Know" (Jay-Z song), 2008
"I Know" (Luther Vandross song), 1998
"I Know" (Philip Bailey song), 1983
"I Know" (Seo Taiji and Boys song), 1992
"I Know" (Shift K3Y song), 2014
"I Know" (Tom Odell song), 2013
"I Know" (Tone Damli song), 2009
"I Know" (Yo Gotti song), 2013
"I Know (I Know)", by John Lennon, 1973
"I Know (You Don't Love Me No More)", by Barbara George, 1961
"I Know", by Ashanti from Chapter II, 2003
"I Know", by B.G. from Checkmate, 2000
"I Know", by Barenaked Ladies from Born on a Pirate Ship, 1996
"I Know", by Big Daddy Weave from When the Light Comes, 2019
"I Know", by Big Sean from Dark Sky Paradise, 2015
"I Know", by Blur, double A-side single with "She's So High", 1990
"I Know", by Destiny's Child from the soundtrack for The Fighting Temptations, 2003
"I Know", by Fiona Apple from When the Pawn..., 1999
"I Know", by Fra Lippo Lippi from In Silence, 1981
"I Know", by the Hollywood Flames, 1953
"I Know", by Keke Wyatt from Rated Love, 2016
"I Know", by Joe Walsh from Songs for a Dying Planet, 1992
"I Know", by New Atlantic, 1992
"I Know", by Paul King from Joy, 1987
"I Know", by Perry Como, 1959
"I Know", by Pink Sweats, 2019
"I Know", by Placebo from Placebo, 1996
"I Know", by Polo G from The Goat, 2020
"I Know", by Post Malone from Hollywood's Bleeding, 2019
"I Know", by Se7en, 2006
"I Know", by Some Velvet Sidewalk, 1988
"I Know", by Vanilla Ninja from Blue Tattoo, 2005
"I Know", by Yasmien Kurdi from In the Name of Love, 2005
"I Know", by YC, 2011

See also 
All I Know (disambiguation)
I Don't Know (disambiguation)